Peter Townley (born 16 November 1955) is a Church of England priest who has been Archdeacon of Pontefract since 2007.

Townley was born in Blackley, Manchester and educated at Moston Brook High School, the University of Sheffield and Ridley Hall, Cambridge. He was ordained deacon in 1980, and priest in 1981. After a curacy  at Christ Church, Ashton-under-Lyne he was Priest in charge of St Hugh, Oldham. He was Rector of All Saints’, Stretford from 1988 to 1996; and then Vicar of St Mary-le-Tower, Ipswich from 1996 to 2008. He was also Rural Dean of Ipswich from 2001 to 2007. In 2004, he was nominated for a bravery award after apprehending a thief, who had stolen a parishioner's handbag.

References

1955 births
21st-century English Anglican priests
20th-century English Anglican priests
People educated at Moston Brook High School
Alumni of the University of Sheffield
Alumni of Ridley Hall, Cambridge
Archdeacons of Pontefract
Living people
People from Blackley
Clergy from Manchester